Rideau is an historic township in eastern Ontario, Canada. It is located in the rural parts of the City of Ottawa, in the extreme south. Its eastern boundary is the Rideau River, its namesake.

The township was created in 1974 after the amalgamation of two other townships: Marlborough, and North Gower, plus Long Island, which was split between Osgoode and Gloucester Townships. In 2001 it was amalgamated into the City of Ottawa.

Communities include Manotick, North Gower, Kars and Burritts Rapids

According to the Canada 2001 Census:
Population: 12,695
% Change (1996-2001): 2.0
Dwellings: 4,414
Area (km²): 408.75
Density (persons per km²): 31.1

By the 2006 census, Rideau's population had increased to 12,960.

Former township municipalities in Ontario
Former municipalities now in Ottawa
Populated places disestablished in 2000

https://rideautwphistory.org/about-us/